Interferon-stimulated gene 20 kDa protein is a protein that in humans is encoded by the ISG20 gene.

References

Further reading